The Vegas Legion (formerly the Paris Legion) is an American professional Call of Duty League (CDL) esports team based in Las Vegas, United States. Vegas Legion is owned by C0ntact Gaming. Paris was announced as one of the first five cities to host a CDL team. According to ESPN, the publisher was looking to sell slots for approximately $25 million per team. Despite being one of the first five cities to join the CDL, the team was the final one to unveil their branding on November 2, 2019. On September 12, 2022, the Legion relocated to Las Vegas.

History

Paris Legion (2020–2022) 
Upon entering the CDL, the team then consisted of the following five man squad: Denz, KiSMET, Louqa, Shockz, and Zed. The team began the season at the bottom of the radar, being looked at as the clear underdogs. Paris immediately responded with upset victories over OpTic Gaming LA and the London Royal Ravens. The team's success did not continue throughout the season however. The team went on to finish the 2020 season with a lackluster record of 11–17, as well as an early exit from the playoffs. This poor showing led the team to drop its entire roster.

After a rough start to their participation in the CDL, Paris released their whole roster and elected to sign Skrapz, Aqua, Classic, and Fire40. Fire was released from the team and replaced by Temp. Not long after, Paris looked to make another roster change and acquired Zaptius in place of Classic, who went to Seattle Surge near the tail-end of the 2021 season.

After a disappointing 2021 season for the French team, the roster was once again shaken up headed into Vanguard with John, Decemate, Felo, and Temp. They would find little success and would eventually release Decemate and Felo to replace them with GRVTY and Jimbo.

Las Vegas Legion (2023–present) 
On 1 June 2022, the Paris Legion announced that the franchise would be relocating to Las Vegas for the 2023 season. The team officially announced that it had relocated to Las Vegas on 12 September 2022, and with the move changed its name to Vegas Legion.

Current roster

References

External links
 

Venture capital-funded esports teams
Call of Duty League teams
Esports teams established in 2019
Esports teams based in the United States